Hannah Eurlings (born 1 January 2003) is a Belgian footballer who plays as a forward for OH Leuven and the Belgium national team.

International career
Eurlings made her debut for the Belgium national team on 1 December 2020, coming on as a substitute for Tessa Wullaert against Switzerland.

Career statistics

Scores and results list Belgium's goal tally first, score column indicates score after each Eurlings goal.

References

External links
 

2003 births
Living people
Belgian women's footballers
Women's association football forwards
Belgium women's international footballers
Belgium women's youth international footballers
UEFA Women's Euro 2022 players
Super League Vrouwenvoetbal players
Oud-Heverlee Leuven (women) players